Bucculatrix pectinella is a moth of the family Bucculatricidae. It is found in Iran and Turkmenistan. It was first described in 1981 by G. Descka. 

The length of the forewings is about 3.5 mm. The ground colour of the forewings and hindwings is yellowish.

References

Bucculatricidae
Moths described in 1981
Moths of Asia